Ab Anari (also Romanized as Āb Ānārī) is a village in Mahur Berenji Rural District, Sardasht District, Dezful County, Khuzestan Province, Iran. At the 2006 census, its population was 57, in 12 families.

References 

Populated places in Dezful County